Sharon is an unincorporated community in Noble County, in the U.S. state of Ohio.

History
Sharon was laid out in 1834. The community takes its name from Sharon Township. A post office was established at Sharon in 1831, and remained in operation until 1984.

References

Unincorporated communities in Noble County, Ohio
Unincorporated communities in Ohio